Mirzaganj is a village in the Jamua CD block in the Khori Mahuwa subdivision of  the Giridih district in the Indian state of Jharkhand.

Geography

Location                              

Area overview
Giridih district is a part of the Chota Nagpur plateau, with rocky soil and extensive forests. Most of the rivers in the district flow from the west to east, except in the northern portion where the rivers flow north and north west. The district has coal and mica mines. It is an overwhelmingly rural district with small pockets of urbanisation.

Note: The map alongside presents some of the notable locations in the district. All places marked in the map are linked in the larger full screen map.

Demographics
According to the 2011 Census of India, Mirzaganj had  total population of 2,817, of which 1,506 (53%) were males and 1,311 (47%) were females. Population in the age range 0–6 years was 403. The total number of literate persons in Mirzaganj was 2,047 (84.80% of the population over 6 years).

Education
Langtababa Mahavidyalaya was established at Mirzaganj in 1983. It is affiliated to Vinoba Bhave University.

References

Villages in Giridih district